Burnstad is an unincorporated community in Logan County, North Dakota, United States.

A post office was established at Burnstad in 1907, and remained in operation until 1979. The community was named for C. P. Burnstad, a cattleman. Little remains of the original community.

Burnstad is the nearest populated place to the Robert Abell Round Barn, which is listed on the National Register of Historic Places.

References

Unincorporated communities in Logan County, North Dakota
Unincorporated communities in North Dakota